"Like Gold" is a song by Australian singer-songwriter Vance Joy. It was released on 3 November 2017 as the second single from Joy's album Nation of Two (2018).

Vance wrote "Like Gold" after coming off the road at the start of 2016. Joy said: "It started with a simple melody I was humming and the idea of looking back at a relationship."

In February 2018, Joy said: "I play a different rhythm from anything I've played before. I really like what the producer Phil Ek did with this song with big spacious drums and I like the way it sounds full of life. It's about a love that you're kind of reflecting on and the fire's gone out but there was some really good times in there."

"Like Gold" was certified gold in Australia in 2019.

Reception
Al Newstead from ABC called the song a "slower heart-on-sleeve ballad", saying: "Between hypnotic plucking and gentle prose, he captures the embers of a relationship that "used to roar like an open fire". Emmy Mack from Music Feeds called the song a "rollicking folk toe-tapper [which] sounds like it was custom-made for group campfire singalong."

Charts

Certifications

References

2017 singles
2016 songs
Vance Joy songs
Songs written by Dan Wilson (musician)
Songs written by Vance Joy